Stephen Hanessian, OC, FRSC, (born April 25, 1935) is a chemist and professor of Canadian and United States citizenship born in Alexandria, Egypt. His research group at Université de Montréal is well known for developing synthetic methodologies, as well as natural product total synthesis. In addition, his group developed Chiron, a computer program used by organic chemists for synthetic planning.

He earned his Ph.D. at Ohio State University in 1960, under the direction of M. L. Wolfrom. He worked as a researcher for Parke-Davis & Co. in Ann Arbor, Michigan until 1968. In 1969 he joined Université de Montréal. Since 2000, he has also been an adjunct professor at University of California, Irvine.

Awards
 1974 - Merck Sharpe & Dohme Award, Chemical Institute of Canada
 1982 - Hudson Award, American Chemical Society
 1987 - Urgel Archambault Award
 1988 - CIC Palladium Medal, Chemical Institute of Canada
 1988 - Alfred Bader Award in organic chemistry, Canadian Society for Chemistry
 1988 - Fellow of the Royal Society of Canada
 1991 - Bell Canada-Forum Award
 1991 - Prix Marie-Victorin
 1992 - E. Smissman Medal, University of Kansas
 1993 - M. L. Wolfrom Award, American Chemical Society
 1996 - Arthur C. Cope Scholar Award, American Chemical Society
 1997 - Izaak-Walton-Killam Award
 1997 - Compagnon Lavoisier, Ordre des chimistes du Québec
 1998 - Officer of the Order of Canada

External links
 Research group homepage
 Chiron software homepage
A video interview of Professor Hanessian

Canadian people of Armenian descent
Canadian chemists
Egyptian emigrants to Canada
Officers of the Order of Canada
Fellows of the Royal Society of Canada
1935 births
Living people
Ohio State University alumni